Charlesbourg is a provincial electoral district in the Capitale-Nationale region of Quebec, Canada that elects members to the National Assembly of Quebec. It consists of part of the Charlesbourg borough of Quebec City.

It was created for the 1973 election from parts of Chauveau and Montmorency electoral districts.

In the change from the 2001 to the 2011 electoral map, it lost very small amounts of territory to Jean-Lesage and Montmorency electoral districts.

In the change from the 2011 to the 2018 electoral map, the riding will gain some territory (roughly the area between Rivère des Roches to Rue George-Muir) from Chauveau.

Members of the National Assembly

Election results

|-
 
|Liberal
|Michel Pigeon
|align="right"|14,196
|align="right"|42.36
|align="right"|

|}

|-
 
|Liberal
|Éric R. Mercier
|align="right"|10,843
|align="right"|27.32
|align="right"|
|-

|-

|}

References

External links
Information
 Elections Quebec

Election results
 Election results (National Assembly)

Maps
 2011 map (PDF)
 2001 map (Flash)
2001–2011 changes (Flash)
1992–2001 changes (Flash)
 Electoral map of Capitale-Nationale region
 Quebec electoral map, 2011

Provincial electoral districts of Quebec City
Charlesbourg